Felipe Landa Jocano (February 5, 1930 – October 27, 2013) was a Filipino anthropologist, educator, and author known for his significant body of work within the field of Philippine Anthropology, and in particular for documenting and translating the Hinilawod, a Western Visayan folk epic.  His eminence within the field of Philippine anthropology was widely recognized during his lifetime, with National Artist F. Sionil Jose dubbing him "the country’s first and foremost cultural anthropologist"

Jocano served as Professor Emeritus at the Asian Center of the University of the Philippines and Executive Director of PUNLAD Research House, Inc. and a professor in University of the Philippines. He has authored numerous books on various aspects of Filipino Society and Culture.

Biography

Early life and education  
Jocano was born in Cabatuan, Iloilo in 1930 - the ninth of eleven children born to Eusebio Jocano, a persevere farmer, and Anastacia Landa.

He finished his elementary studies at a public school in Iloilo and then ran away to Manila because his family could not afford to send him to high school. He eventually graduated from the Arellano High School in Manila, working his way through to graduation.  After this, he tried to enroll in some college courses, but distractions and an illness forced him to return to his native Iloilo in 1954, where we eventually earned a Bachelor of Arts degree from the Central Philippine University in 1957.

Return to Iloilo, interest in folklore, and work at the National Museum 
It was during Jocano's period of return to Iloilo that he first developed an interest in folklore.  This interest brought him into contact with Robert Fox, then an anthropologist working for the National Museum of the Philippines, who got him a job as "research aid" at the museum - doing mostly janitorial work. Through his work ethic and by taking the initiative to draw the museum director's attention to his typing skills, Jocano was eventually moved to the museum's typing pool.

Work at the National Museum inspired Jocano to write a series of articles discussing Philippine legends surrounding plant and animal life, which was published in the Manila Times.  The Department of Education took note of the series and asked Jocano if it could be published in "Diwang Kayumanggi", a high school teaching supplement regularly issued by the Department of Education at the time.  Jocano's condition for the reprinting was that the publication would also indicate his position as "janitor." As a result, Jocano was promoted from "Research Aid" to "Scientist 1", although his job description remained the same.

University education and teaching career
Taking advantage of a study grant, Jocano went to the University of Chicago to earn a master's degree in Anthropology, graduating in 1962.  He took up a teaching position there and later got his Ph.D. in Anthropology from the same university.

Jocano eventually decided to come home to teach at the University of the Philippines, where he served until his retirement 31 years later.  In that time, he served among other functions, as Chairman of the UP Department of Anthropology, director of Philippine Studies Program at the UP Asian Center, Dean of the UP Institute of Philippine Studies, and head of Asian Center Museum Laboratory.

Jocano's association with the University of the Philippines continued after retirement, as he was named professor emeritus of the UP Asian Center.

Jocano's work as a scholarly writer was prolific and wide-ranging.  His study of ethnology expanded into numerous aspects of Filipino life - from folklore and pre-colonial history to international relations, to the rural community and urban slum life. He was one of the first to even suggest the ethnological study of the development of the Philippines' corporate culture.

In 1999, he was awarded a special citation for a lifetime of writing and publishing on various aspects of Philippine culture by the Manila Critics Circle.

Pioneering use of Participant Observation in Philippine settings 
As one of the earliest Filipino-born researchers to receive proper scholarly training in anthropology, Jocano became a pioneer in the use of  Participant Observation as a research methodology in Philippine ethnographic research, applying it in numerous places, including Capiz, Ilocos, and notably, the urban poor community of Looban, Sta Mesa in Manila.

Jocano's work in the Slum of Looban was seminal in its insistence on "living in the community and taking part, whenever possible in the activities of the members, observing what they do and checking the observed behaviour in terms of what they say and do."  Earlier research on slums mostly relied on the use of questionnaires, which Jocano dismissed as inappropriate for studying urban poor society: "One cannot possibly go up and paper and ask questions without arousing suspicions especially among street corner gang members."

National Artist F. Sionil Jose recounts that some of Jocano's adventures in Participant Observation resulted in  memorably humorous episodes:
"At one time, he got himself hired as a motel boy while doing a study on sexuality among Filipinos. He confided that he surprised some of his colleagues who patronized these motels. From that study, Pepe gave me a chapter which I published in my journal, Solidarity. Right at the press, some 20 copies disappeared. The issue was sold out in a couple of months, I had to order a reprint. As one academic told me — it was a landmark article — the first "scholarly pornography."And at one time, a relative accosted him in Quiapo where he was actually begging at the church door to gather data on his study of the urban poor. The relative was so shocked to see him there in tatters, he had to drag away the protesting scholar with the promise to help him.''"

 "Hinilawod: Tales From The Mouth of The Halawod River" 
One of Jocano's earliest major contributions to the field of cultural anthropology and a significant contribution to recorded Filipino folk literature was the documentation of the epic poem Hinilawod (which means "Tales From The Mouth of The Halawod River").

The epic recounts the story of the exploits of three Sulodnon demigod brothers, Labaw Donggon, Humadapnon and Dumalapdap of ancient Panay. Jocano, assisted by a radio technician from the Central Philippine University, convinced Sulod folk chanters Ulang Udig and Hugan-an to recount the story, and allow them to record it on cassette.  The process of acquiring this permission took years, from Jocano's first contact with Ulang Udig in 1955 to the recording of Hugan-an's 30-hour performance of the epic in 1957.  Jocano eventually also published the text in his book "Hinilawod: Adventures of Humadapnon Tarangban I" (The epic was once again recorded in 1999, by researcher Alejo Zata, working among Sulod natives who still performed it and for whom the epic was still very much an active part of their culture.)

There have been numerous stage performances of Hinilawod, all based mostly on Jocano's text. In response to a 2012 performance of a stage version of the epic at the Cultural Center of the Philippines by a theater group called Hiyas Kayumanggi, National Artist F.Sionil Jose noted:"There is so much in our folk culture that can be used by our creative artists. All we have to do is turn to our cultural anthropologists like Felipe Landa Jocano."''

Core Population Theory
Jocano was one of the first scholars to suggest alternatives to H. Otley Beyer's Wave Migration Theory of migration to the Philippines.

His Core Population Theory proposed that there weren't clear discrete waves of migration, but a long process of cultural evolution and movement of people.  The theory suggests that early inhabitants of Southeast Asia were once of the same ethnic group with similar culture, but eventually -through a gradual process driven by environmental factors - differentiated themselves from one another.

Other prominent anthropologists like Robert Fox, Alfredo E. Evangelista, Jesus Peralta, Zeus A. Salazar, and Ponciano L. Bennagen agreed with Jocano. However some still preferred Beyer's theory as the more acceptable model, including anthropologist E. Arsenio Manuel.

Personal life 
Jocano married Adria Payad and they had two children, Felipe Jr. and Lizabeth. He died in 2013 at the age of 83.

Partial list of published books

References 

1930 births
2013 deaths
Filipino anthropologists
20th-century Filipino historians
Filipino male writers
Writers from Iloilo
Central Philippine University people
Central Philippine University alumni
20th-century anthropologists
21st-century anthropologists
20th-century male writers
21st-century male writers
20th-century non-fiction writers
21st-century non-fiction writers
21st-century Filipino writers
Visayan people
Male non-fiction writers